Sandro Shugladze, (Сандро Давидович Шуґладзе, born 24 October 1990 in Terjola, Georgian SSR, Soviet Union), is a Ukrainian footballer, currently playing for FC Zimbru Chișinău.

Personal life
The Ukrainian midfielder has Georgian roots.

External links 
 Stats on Sevstopol club (Rus)
 Profile on UFF website 

1990 births
Living people
Ukrainian footballers
FC Sevastopol players
Association football midfielders